This is a list of large or well-known interstate or international companies in the Westport, Connecticut area. , Westport was home to one Fortune 500 company:  construction equipment manufacturer Terex (#402).

Companies currently headquartered in Westport, Connecticut

Charity
 Save the Children

Food
 Newman's Own Inc
 Eatza Pizza

Investment management
 Bridgewater Associates LP

Marketing & Media
Connoisseur Media
Labate Marketing - Marketing & Consulting Firm
 dLife - multimedia diabetes education (and marketing) company with a weekly television program on CNBC

Companies formerly headquartered in Westport 
 Business Express Airlines
 Pequot Capital Management - investment management
 Playtex Products Inc. - feminine, infant, and skin care products
 Terex Corp  - #402 on the Fortune 500; construction and farm machinery

References

 
Westport